Claus Raab (1943 – 14 October 2012) was a German musicologist and university scholar.

Life 
Born in Herrieden (Mittelfranken), Raab studied historical and comparative musicology and philosophy at the Freie Universität Berlin. In 1970 he received his doctorate in drum music about the Hausa people in North-West-Nigeria and in 1972 became a lecturer at the Folkwang University of the Arts. In 2008 he retired and died in Essen.

Publications 
 Trommelmusik der Hausa in Nord-West-Nigeria, Munich: Renner, 1970
 Folkwang: Geschichte einer Idee; Musik, Tanz, Theater, Wilhelmshaven: Noetzel, 1994
 Beethovens Kunst der Sonate. Die drei letzten Klaviersonaten op. 109, 110, 111 und ihr Thema, Saarbrücken: Pfau, 1996
 Merkwürdige Geschichten und Gestalten um einen Walzer: Ludwig van Beethovens "Diabelli Variations op. 120 und ihre Verbindung zu Graphik und Literatur, Saarbrücken: Pfau, 1999
 Das Beethoven-Lexikon, edited by Claus Raab and Heinz von Loesch, Laaber 2008

References

External links 
 
 Nachruf auf der Website der Folkwang Universität der Künste

20th-century German musicologists
Beethoven scholars
1943 births
2012 deaths
People from Middle Franconia